Esther Wangeci (born ) is a Kenyan female volleyball player. She is part of the Kenya women's national volleyball team.

She participated in the 2014 FIVB Volleyball World Grand Prix.
On club level she played for Kenya Pipeline Company in 2014.

References

External links
 Profile at FIVB.org

1990 births
Living people
Kenyan women's volleyball players
Place of birth missing (living people)